Mergim Krasniqi (born 23 August 1992) is a Swedish footballer of Kosovan descent who plays as a goalkeeper for GAIS.

Club career

Örebro
On 30 December 2020, Krasniqi signed a one-year contract with Allsvenskan club Örebro and this return would become legally effective two days later. On 20 February 2021, he was named as a Örebro substitute for the first time in a 2020–21 Svenska Cupen group stage match against Trelleborg. His debut with Örebro came on 18 July in a 0–2 home defeat against Hammarby after being named in the starting line-up.

GAIS
On 4 February 2022, Krasniqi joined GAIS on a one-season deal.

Career statistics

Club

References

External links

1992 births
Living people
People from Borås
Swedish men's footballers
Swedish people of Kosovan descent
Swedish people of Albanian descent
Kosovan men's footballers
Association football goalkeepers
Division 3 (Swedish football) players
Division 2 (Swedish football) players
Ettan Fotboll players
Superettan players
Norrby IF players
Allsvenskan players
Örebro SK players
GAIS players
Sportspeople from Västra Götaland County